Cnemaspis aceh is a species of gecko endemic to Sumatra in Indonesia.

References

aceh
Reptiles described in 2017
Fauna of Sumatra